Synaphris is a genus of araneomorph spiders in the family Synaphridae, and was first described by Eugène Louis Simon in 1894. Originally placed with the tangle web spiders, it was moved to the Symphytognathidae in 1973, and to the Synaphridae in 2003.

Species
 it contains eleven species, found in Asia, Africa, and Europe:
Synaphris agaetensis Wunderlich, 1987 – Canary Is.
Synaphris calerensis Wunderlich, 1987 – Canary Is.
Synaphris dalmatensis Wunderlich, 1980 – Croatia
Synaphris franzi Wunderlich, 1987 – Canary Is.
Synaphris lehtineni Marusik, Gnelitsa & Kovblyuk, 2005 – Romania, Bulgaria, Ukraine
Synaphris letourneuxi (Simon, 1884) (type) – Egypt
Synaphris orientalis Marusik & Lehtinen, 2003 – Turkmenistan, Iran?
Synaphris saphrynis Lopardo, Hormiga & Melic, 2007 – Spain, Savage Is.?
Synaphris schlingeri Miller, 2007 – Madagascar
Synaphris toliara Miller, 2007 – Madagascar
Synaphris wunderlichi Marusik & Zonstein, 2011 – Israel

See also
 List of Synaphridae species

References

Araneomorphae genera
Spiders of Africa
Spiders of Asia
Synaphridae